is a railway station on the Shin'etsu Main Line in the city of Jōetsu, Niigata, Japan, operated by East Japan Railway Company (JR East).

Lines
Kakizaki Station is served by the Shin'etsu Main Line, and is 17.6 kilometers from the terminus of the line at Naoetsu Station.

Station layout
The station consists of one side platform adjacent to the station building, connected to an island platform by a footbridge. The station has a "Midori no Madoguchi" staffed ticket office.

Platforms

History

The station opened on 13 May 1897. With the privatization of Japanese National Railways (JNR) on 1 April 1987, the station came under the control of JR East.

Passenger statistics
In fiscal 2017, the station was used by an average of 525 passengers daily (boarding passengers only).

Surrounding area
Kakizaki Post Office

See also
 List of railway stations in Japan

References

External links

 JR East station information 

Railway stations in Niigata Prefecture
Railway stations in Japan opened in 1897
Stations of East Japan Railway Company
Shin'etsu Main Line
Jōetsu, Niigata